Hairenik Association (Hairenik Association Inc.) is a publishing house fully owned and operated by the Armenian Revolutionary Federation located in Watertown, Massachusetts, United States.

Publications
Its publications have included: 
Hairenik, a weekly (formerly daily) newspaper entirely in Armenian 
Armenian Weekly (formerly Hairenik Weekly), an English-language newspaper
Hairenik Monthly and presently quarterly
Armenian Review, an English language periodical

It also publishes many books, calendars and special commemorative publications

Web Broadcasts
Hairenik Association also runs a web radio and a web TV station.

Hairenik Building Restoration Fund 
The Hairenik Building Restoration Fund is a campaign to raise money to upgrade and repair the Hairenik Building, the Watertown offices of the Hairenik Association.

The Hairenik Association moved to its present location in 1986 following a long fundraising campaign to replace its aging headquarters on Stuart Street in downtown Boston. Following the 1998 campaign that retired the building's mortgage, the Restoration Fund seeks to modernize the Hairenik Building and return it to a good state of repair.

External links
Official Hairenik Association website
Hairenik official site
Armenian Weekly
Armenian Review
Hairenik Online Radio Station
Hairenik Online TV Station

Watertown, Massachusetts
Armenian-American culture in Massachusetts